The women's long jump event  at the 1998 European Athletics Indoor Championships was held on 1 March.

Results

References

Final results

Long jump at the European Athletics Indoor Championships
Long
1998 in women's athletics